Dalton Pando (born March 4, 1996) is an American soccer player who most recently played as a midfielder for Tormenta FC in USL League One.

References

External links
 
 Profile at UC Santa Barbara Athletics

1996 births
Living people
American soccer players
Association football midfielders
FC Tucson players
Johnson & Wales University alumni
Soccer players from Sacramento, California
Tormenta FC players
UC Santa Barbara Gauchos men's soccer players
USL League One players
USL League Two players